Joensuun Kiekko-Pojat is a Finnish semi-professional ice hockey team that plays in the Mestis. The club has spent three seasons in the top flight of Finnish hockey, season 1971–72 in SM-sarja and seasons 1989-90 and 1991–92 in SM-liiga.

Honours

Champions

 Mestis (1): 2009-10
 Suomi-sarja (2): 2003–04, 2014–15
 I-Divisioona (3): 1988–89, 1990–91, 1992–93, 1996-97

Runners-up
 Mestis (2): 2008-09, 2011-12
 Mestis (1): 2015-16
 Suomi-sarja (1): 2003

Current team 
Updated February 20, 2017

|}

Team officials
Updated February 20, 2017

Retired numbers 
# 1 Tapio Pohtinen
# 9 Hannu Kapanen
# 15 Lauri Mononen
# 25 Markku Kyllönen

Former players 
 Tero Arkiomaa
 Pavel Brendl
 Joe Fontas
 Jocelyn Guimond
 Roberts Jekimovs
 Hannu Kapanen
 Jari Kapanen
 Lubomir Kolnik
 Markku Kyllönen
 Mikael Ruohomaa
 Alexander Salák
 Luke Sellars
 Antonin Stavjana
 Rostislav Vlach

All time statistics leaders

Season by season record
Since rejoining the Mestis in 2004–05

References

External links 
www.jokipojat.fi 

Mestis teams
Joensuu
Former Liiga teams